Newsela is a literacy-focused edtech startup company founded by Matthew Gross. Newsela offers English and Spanish education content. Newsela serves 90% of schools, including over 37 million K-12 students and 2.5 million teachers. Newsela news content is free with a registered account and additional resources are available by subscription. The content is designed to engage students, facilitate differentiated instruction and align to state education standards.

The company has been named one of Fast Company's Most Innovative Companies two years in a row   and one of Deloitte's Fastest Growing Tech Companies two years in a row.

Background

History
While former teacher Matthew Gross was working on the Common Core standards roll out in New York, he was disappointed to discover outdated textbooks that were labeled "Common Core-Aligned". One of Gross's children struggled with reading. After meeting with his son's assistant principal, he felt like she had given up on his son. Gross decided to start Newsela in 2013 for his son and to make a larger impact in education.

Partnerships
Newsela's ongoing partnership with The Virginia School Consortium for Learning (VaSCL) enables members to access Newsela content, technology and professional learning at a discounted rate, as of December 2020. 

In response to the COVID-19 pandemic, Newsela announced a partnership with NWEA to help teachers differentiate instruction. After a student takes a MAP Growth assessment, Newsela will automatically show teachers content at that student's reading level. 

BrainPop and Newsela formed a partnership on October 10, 2017. Users can access Newsela's resources directly from BrainPop topic pages.

Newsela editor-in-chief Jennifer Coogan partnered with the American Press Institute to help combat fake news websites in the United States in October 2016.

Features 
Newsela offers news articles that can be customized to match a student's reading level. Newsela's over 14,000 texts come from more than 175 publishers, including the Associated Press and Encyclopedia Britannica. The company offers supplemental instructional materials, including assessments, lessons and professional development.  English language arts (ELA), Social Studies, Science and Social and Emotional Learning (SEL) content are available in English and Spanish.

Other versions 
Due to concerns about mature content, Newsela has created Newsela Elementary, with articles targeted toward elementary school students. Newsela also created Newsela PRO, a paid upgrade for teachers to use more features.

Reception 
Common Sense Media Education reviewer Patricia Monticello Kievlan rated Newsela five stars.

References

External links 

Webinar About BrainPop and Newsela Partnership

American educational websites